Filippo Neviani is the eleventh studio album by Italian singer-songwriter Nek released on 16 April 2013. In the same year it was recorded and released in Spanish language. The album is notable for being mainly written, composed and performed by Nek alone. In 2014, Nek received the Lunezia award in the "Pop Rock" category for the album due to musical-literary value.

Overview
The album's title is Nek's personal name and surname. The album was "written more natural, more personal, more heartfelt". It is his first album artwork that includes his personal name with stage name, because it's his way of saying that the man Filip and the artist Nek are not two different people, that more than ever they correspond, a turning point in his career.

The album was dedicated to his recently deceased father, and the birth of his daughter, Beatrice Maria. Nek said that his father always wanted to see Filippo's surname "Neviani" on a cover of one of his albums.

Composition
All of the instruments, such as the guitar, bass guitar, and drums, were played by Nek. This was due to the fact that when musicians play certain instruments for his songs, he felt that "you lose a part of the magic". This was also why he kept musical sequences, synths, violins, and other orchestral instruments out of the album, with support only from his engineer.

Nek considered the music in the album to be more rock than his previous albums. He notes "It's a genre that I have always heard, I'm an incurable nostalgic... I've never done this kind of music explicitly, as a citation, but I wanted to get closer to a color more 'rock' because I felt the need... I listened to many rock bands like Muse, Editors, Kings Of Leon, Red Hot Chili Peppers, [which was] useful during the development of the songs", to show his "true spirit".

The album opens with song "Hey Dio" which is a reflection of current dark period addressed to all, even those who are not faithful Catholics – "laity and believers like me have the same need to find answers in this cultural and political reality made dirty by latent anger, decline of values and "mors tua vita mea" (your death, my life) as a philosophy of life". He considered the song for the opening because it gives the musical direction to the whole album. The song "Dentro l'anima" is dedicated to his daughter Beatrice Maria and in the intro includes her heartbeat, while "Il mondo tra le mani" is dedicated to Martina, daughter of his wife.

Release
"Congiunzione astrale", the music video was recorded in San Francisco by Marco Salom, and recounts a story of Kim and Jason, two young people which will meet each other in "Astral conjunction". The Spanish version of the single "La metà di niente" ("La mitad de nada") was recorded in duet with Sergio Dalma.

Reception

Mattia Marzi from Rockol gave the album 3.5/5 stars, noted that "Nek confirms himself as complete songwriter and able to play the triple role of author, performer and musician: all tracks on the disc have been played by him directly". It is "simple and direct, without too many tricks or electronic tricks, made with clean sound, poor", and what characterizes the album "it could be defined as a natural rock and inspired by the typical sounds of the great international power-trio band, making the album a happy island in the confusing scene and too pop-winking of the Italian discography. Not a disposable product, this, but a work sincere and unpretentious".

Track listing

Personnel

Music
Performer: Filippo Neviani
Arranger: F. Neviani, Dado Parisini
Producers: F. Neviani, D. Parisini, Alfredo Cerruti (executive)
Production Assistant: Serena Baer
Studio Assistant: Daniele Lanzara
Mixer: David Bottrill (1, 5, 7, 9) at Mainstation Studio in Toronto 
Mixer: Max "MC" Costa (2, 3, 4, 6, 8, 10) at Hukapan Studio in Milan
Recording: Max "MC" Costa at Hukapan Studio in Milan
Mastering: Antonio Baglio at Nautilus Studio in Milan

Cover art
Photographer: Johnny Buzzerio
Assistant: Sonia Yruel
Artist: Sbatch
Hair & Make Up: Armando Sarabia
Stylist: Tessa Watson

Charts

References

2013 albums
Nek albums